Joseph Black (February 8, 1924 – May 17, 2002) was an American right-handed pitcher in Negro league and Major League Baseball for the Brooklyn Dodgers, Cincinnati Redlegs, and Washington Senators who became the first black pitcher to win a World Series game, in 1952.

Early years
A native of Plainfield, New Jersey, he starred at Plainfield High School. Black served in the US Army during World War II, and attended Morgan State University on a baseball scholarship and graduated in 1950. He later received an honorary doctorate from Shaw University. He was a member of Omega Psi Phi fraternity. He appears prominently in Roger Kahn's classic book, The Boys of Summer.

Negro and minor leagues
Black helped the Baltimore Elite Giants of the Negro leagues win two championships in seven years. He and Jackie Robinson pushed for a pension plan for Negro league players and was instrumental in getting the plan to include retired players who had played in the leagues before 1944. Black then played for a year in the Brooklyn Dodgers' minor league system.

Call up to Brooklyn
The Dodgers promoted Black to the major leagues in 1952 at 28, five years after teammate Jackie Robinson broke baseball's color barrier. He roomed with Robinson while on the Dodgers. Black was chosen Rookie of the Year after winning 15 games and saving 15 others for the National League champions. He had a 2.15 ERA but, with 142 innings pitched, fell eight innings short of winning the ERA title.

Strapped for pitching, Dodgers manager Chuck Dressen brought Black out of the bullpen and started him three times in seven days in the 1952 World Series against the New York Yankees. He won the opener with a six-hitter over Allie Reynolds, 4–2, then lost the fourth game, 2–0, and the seventh, 4–2

Black's decline
The spring after the 1952 World Series, Dressen urged Black to add some pitches to his strong slowball, which was his favorite pitch.  In six seasons, he compiled a 30–12 record, half of his wins coming in his rookie season.

After baseball
After his career ended, Black was a scout for the Washington Senators (1959–60). He taught health and physical education at Hubbard Junior High School in Plainfield, New Jersey, and later became an executive with Greyhound in Phoenix.

In addition to lobbying for black players, he remained in baseball through his affiliation with the commissioner's office, where he consulted with players about career choices.

In 1991, Black appeared as a fictional character, 'Joe 'Playday' Sims', in TV's Cosby Show, in the 7th Season episode, "There's Still No Joy in Mudville", which originally aired April 4, 1991.

He was a board director of the Baseball Assistance Team and worked for the Arizona Diamondbacks in community relations after they joined the National League in 1998. Black was a regular in the Diamondbacks' dugout during batting practice and in the press box.  He also performed much charity work in the Phoenix area.

He wrote a syndicated column, "By The Way", for Ebony magazine and an autobiography, Ain't Nobody Better Than You.

Years later, Peter O'Malley (son of Walter, who owned the team before Peter) awarded Black a 1955 championship ring (Black had been traded prior to the World Series run).

Black died of prostate cancer at age 78 on May 17, 2002. He was interred in the Hillside Cemetery in Scotch Plains, New Jersey.

Honors and awards
The Arizona Fall League's Most Valuable Player award is named for Black. First presented in 2002, the award honors the 1952 National League Rookie of the Year.

There is a plaque honoring him at Chase Field alongside the Diamondbacks' championships and retired numbers.

Beginning in 2010, the Washington Nationals have presented the Joe Black Award to a Washington area organization chosen for its work promoting baseball in African American communities. The award recognizes Black as the first African American player on the Washington Senators (1957).

In 2010, the Plainfield, NJ school board named the Plainfield High School baseball complex "The Joe Black Baseball Field" in his honor.

References

External links

Baseball Almanac
The Deadball Era
Liga Cubana de Béisbol Profesional – Temporada 1951-52 : Líderes individuales. Rogério Manzano website
Joe Black Biography. Society for American Baseball Research

1924 births
2002 deaths
African Americans in World War II
Baltimore Elite Giants players
Baseball players from New Jersey
Brooklyn Dodgers players
Burials at Hillside Cemetery (Scotch Plains, New Jersey)
Cangrejeros de Santurce (baseball) players
Cienfuegos players
Cincinnati Redlegs players
Deaths from cancer in Arizona
Deaths from prostate cancer
Liga de Béisbol Profesional Roberto Clemente pitchers
Major League Baseball pitchers
Major League Baseball Rookie of the Year Award winners
Montreal Royals players
Morgan State Bears baseball players
Navegantes del Magallanes players
American expatriate baseball players in Venezuela
Plainfield High School (New Jersey) alumni
Sportspeople from Plainfield, New Jersey
Seattle Rainiers players
St. Paul Saints (AA) players
Tulsa Oilers (baseball) players
Washington Senators (1901–1960) players
Washington Senators (1901–60) scouts
United States Army personnel of World War II
21st-century African-American people
African-American United States Army personnel
20th-century African-American sportspeople